Lídia Jorge  (born 18 June 1946) is a prominent Portuguese novelist and author whose work is representative of a recent style of Portuguese writing, the so-called "Post Revolution Generation".

Life 
Lídia Jorge was born in the village of Boliqueime in the Algarve region of southern Portugal in a family of farmers and emigrants. She graduated in Romance Philology from the Faculty of Arts of the University of Lisbon and became a secondary school teacher. In this position she spent some decisive years in Angola and Mozambique, during the last period of the Portuguese Colonial War, but most of her teaching career was in Portugal. She was a visiting professor at the Faculty of Arts of the University of Lisbon between 1995 and 1999. She also served as a member of the Portuguese High Authority for Media ((Social Communication)) and was a member of the General Council of the University of Algarve.

Publications 
Lídia Jorge's first publication, the novel O Dia dos Prodígios [The Day of the Prodigies] (1980), is considered to be a major contribution to the new wave of modern Portuguese literature which followed the end of the Estado Novo regime in 1974. The two novels which followed, O Cais das Merendas [The Wharf of the Parties’ Remains] (1982) and Notícia da Cidade Silvestre [The Wild Town Remembering] (1984) both won the Lisbon Municipality Literary Prize.

It was, however, with A Costa dos Murmúrios [The Murmuring Coast] (1988), a book that draws upon her experiences in colonial Africa, that the author confirmed her status as one of the leading figures in modern Portuguese literature.

In 1998 O Vale da Paixão [The Painter of Birds] won a number of awards. Four years later the novel O Vento Assobiando nas Gruas [The Wind Whistling in the Cranes] (2002) won the Grande Prémio da Associação Portuguesa de Escritores (Portuguese Writers' Association Prize) and the Prémio Correntes d'Escritas (Prize for New Currents in Writing).

In 2007 Lídia Jorge published the novel Combateremos a Sombra [We Shall Fight the Shadow], which was launched at the Fernando Pessoa Foundation in Lisbon. This novel won the Michel Brisset Prize 2008 awarded by the French Psychiatrists Association.

In 2009 the author published the essay Contrato Sentimental [Sentimental Contract], a critical reflection on the future of Portugal. In 2011 she wrote A Noite das Mulheres Cantoras [The Night of the Singing Women].

Os Memoráveis, published in 2014, is a book about the mythology of the Carnation Revolution, recovering the theme of O Dia dos Prodígios, her first book. In 2018, she published Estuário, about the vulnerability of the present time.

Lídia Jorge has also written for the younger audience: O Grande Voo do Pardal [The Great Flight of the Sparrow] (2007) illustrated by Inês de Oliveira, and Romance do Grande Gatão [Big Tomcat's Novel] (2010) illustrated by Danuta Wojciechowska.

Although she had written poetry from an early age, it was only in 2019 that she published her first book of poems, O Livro das Tréguas. Lídia Jorge has published anthologies of short stories, Marido e Outros Contos [Husband and Other Stories] (1997), O Belo Adormecido [The Sleeping Beau] (2003), Praça de Londres [London Plaza] (2008), O Amor em Lobito Bay [Love in Lobito Bay] (2016) in addition to separate editions of A Instrumentalina (1992) and O Conto do Nadador [The story of the Swimmer] (1992).

In 2020, under the title Em Todos os Sentidos, she gathered the chronicles she had read over the course of a year on Portuguese public radio, Antena 2.

Main Themes 
- the colonial and dictatorial past;

- the meaning of revolutions;

- tensions between modern and postmodern society;

- conflicts between generations;

- family breakups;

- the female condition;

- emigration.

Adaptations

Theatre 
Lídia Jorge's play A Maçon was staged at the Dona Maria II National Theatre in 1997, directed by Carlos Avilez. A theatrical adaptation of O Dia dos Prodígios was also performed, directed by Cucha Carvalheiro at Teatro da Trindade in Lisbon. Recently, Instruções para Voar was performed by ACTA, at Teatro Lethes in Faro and Teatro da Trindade. The latter was directed by Juni Dahr; Jean-Guy Lecayt was responsible for the scenography.

Cinema and TV 
The novel A Costa dos Murmurios was adapted to cinema in 2004 by Margarida Cardoso. The short story Miss Beijo was adapted for Portuguese public television (RTP) in 2021 and directed by Miguel Simal.

Representation 
The literary agency that represents Lídia Jorge, Literarische Agentur Dr. Ray-GüdeMertin (of the literature professor and literary agent by the same name), is based in Frankfurt and is now directed by Nicole Witt.

Academy 
Lídia Jorge's novels are translated into several languages. Her works, in addition to editions in Brazil, have been translated into more than twenty languages, namely English, French, German, Dutch, Spanish, Swedish, Hebrew, Italian and Greek, and are the object of study in Portuguese and foreign universities. Several essays have also been dedicated to them.

The University of Algarve, on December 15, 2010, awarded her a Doctorate Honoris Causa. In 2020, issue 205 of COLÓQUIO LETRAS Magazine was dedicated to her. In 2021, number 136 of the Spanish Magazine TURIA also dedicated its main dossier to the novelist. In September of that year, the University of Geneva, in Switzerland, inaugurated the Lídia Jorge Chair and in November, at the University of Massachusetts UMass Amherst, the protocol for a Lídia Jorge Chair was signed. This Chair was inaugurated in April 2022.

Tributes 
On December 17, 2004, the Municipal Council of Albufeira inaugurated the Lídia Jorge Municipal Library in her honour. To mark the 30th anniversary of the publication of O Dia dos Prodígios, the Municipality of Loulé promoted a large bio-bibliographic exhibition, “Thirty Years of Published Writing", between November 2010 and March 2011 at the Convento de Santo António dos Olivais.

In Portugal, the then President of the Republic, Jorge Sampaio, awarded her the Grand Cross of the Order of Infante D. Henrique on March 9, 2005. The President of the French Republic, Jacques Chirac, on April 13, 2005, decorated her as a Chevalier of the French Order of Arts and Letters, being later elevated to the rank of Officer, on July 14, 2015.

In 2021, Lídia Jorge was appointed member of the Portuguese Council of State by President Marcelo Rebelo de Sousa for the period 2021-2026.

She is a regular contributor to Jornal de Letras and has written chronicles for Público and El País.

Bibliography 
Novels:
 O Dia dos Prodígios (The Day of Prodigies) - 1980 
 O Cais das Merendas (The Quay of the Parties Remains) - 1982
 Notícia da Cidade Silvestre (The Wild Town Remembering) - 1984
 A Costa dos Murmúrios (The Murmuring Coast) - 1988 (Available in English)
 A Última Dona - 1992
 O Jardim Sem Limites (Limitless Garden) - 1995
 O Vale da Paixão (The Painter of Birds) - 1998 (Available in English)
 O Vento Assobiando nas Gruas (The Wind Whistling in the Cranes) - 2002
 Combateremos a Sombra (We Shall Fight the Shadow) - 2007
 A Noite das Mulheres Cantoras (The Night of the Singing Women) - 2011
 Os Memoráveis (The Memorable) - 2014
Estuário (Estuary) - 2018

Short-Stories:
 A Instrumentalina - 1992
 O Conto do Nadador (The Story of the Swimmer) - 1992
 Marido e outros Contos (Husband and Other Stories) - 1997
 O Belo Adormecido (The Sleeping Beau) - 2004
Praça de Londres (London Plaza) - 2008
O Organista (The Organist) - 2014
O Amor em Lobito Bay (Love in Lobito Bay) - 2016

Children's Literature:
 O Grande Voo do Pardal [The Great Flight of the Sparrow] - (2007) 
 Romance do Grande Gatão [Big Tomcat's Novel] - (2010)
O Conto da Isabelinha (Lilibeth's Tale) - 2018

Essays:
 Contrato Sentimental (Sentimental Contract) - 2009

Plays:
 A Maçon (The Mason) - 1997
 Instruções para Voar (Instructions to Fly) - 2016

Poetry:
 O Livro das Tréguas - 2019

Chronicles:
 Em todos os Sentidos - 2020

Distinctions

National orders
 Grand Cross of the Order of Prince Henry the Navigator (9 March 2005)
 Chevalier of the French Ordre des Arts et des Lettres (13 April 2005)
 Officer of the French Ordre des Arts et des Lettres (14 July 2015)

Prizes 
 Malheiro Dias Prize, Academia das Ciências de Lisboa (1981)
 Cidade de Lisboa Literary Prize (1982 and 1984), O Cais das Merendas
 Dom Dinis Prize,  Casa de Mateus Foundation (1998), O Vale da Paixão and Notícia da Cidade Silvestre
 Bordallo Literature Prize, Casa da Imprensa (1998), O Vale da Paixão
 Máxima Literature Prize (1998), O Vale da Paixão
 P.E.N. Club Fiction Prize (1998), O Vale da Paixão
 Jean Monnet European Literature Prize, European Writer of the Year, France (2000), O Vale da Paixão
 Portuguese Writers Association Prize (2002), O Vento Assobiando nas Gruas
 Correntes d’Escritas Prize (2002), O Vento Assobiando nas Gruas
 International Albatroz Literature Prize, Günter Grass Foundation, Germany (2006)
 Portuguese Writers Association Prize  –  Millenium BCP (2007)
 Giuseppe Acerbi Special Prize Scrittura Femmenile, Italy (2007)
 French Psychiatrists Association, Michel Brisset Prize, France (2008), Combateremos a Sombra
 Latin Union International Prize (2011)
 Spanish-Portuguese Art and Culture Prize (2014)
 Vergílio Ferreira Prize (2015)
Urbano Tavares Rodrigues Prize (2015)
XXIV Grand Prize in Literature DST (2019), Estuário
Rosalía de Castro do Centro PEN Galiza Prize (2020)
FIL Award for Literature in Romance Languages (2020)
 Grand Prize for Chronicle, Portuguese Writers Association Prize /City Council of Loulé (2021), Em  Todos os Sentidos

References

External links 
 Donning the “Gift” of Representation: Lídia Jorge's A Instrumentalina, by Ana Paula Ferreira

1946 births
Living people
University of Lisbon alumni
20th-century Portuguese women writers
20th-century Portuguese writers
21st-century Portuguese women writers
Grand Crosses of the Order of Prince Henry